Pavlos Kontides (born 11 February 1990) is a Cypriot sailor. He became the first Cypriot athlete ever to win an Olympic medal for his country, by winning the silver medal at the 2012 Summer Olympics in the Men's Laser class behind Tom Slingsby. On Tuesday 19 of September 2017, Kontides took the 1st place in 2017 ILCA World Championship in Split, Croatia, becoming a World Champion.  He won the championship again in 2018, as well as a silver in 2013.

Kontides also competed at the 2008 Summer Olympics in the  Men's Laser class, obtaining the 13th place. In the same year, he won gold at the World Junior Championships and in 2009 he won two silver medals in World Cups and a bronze in the Paneuropean Men's Championship.

He competed at the 2016 Summer Olympics in Men's Laser class where he placed 7th. He was the flag bearer for Cyprus during the Parade of Nations.

He also competed at the 2020 Summer Olympics in Men's Laser class where he was placed 4th.

Kontides is currently ranked 6th in the ILCA 7 men's rankings.

Kontides was born in Limassol. He is a member of the Limassol Nautical Club and is currently trained by Jozo Jakelić. He is studying ship science at the University of Southampton, and has taken a two-year break.

The Republic of Cyprus honored Kontides through the issue of a Commemorative Stamp.

References

External links
 
 
 

1990 births
Living people
Sportspeople from Limassol
Olympic sailors of Cyprus
Cypriot male sailors (sport)
Olympic silver medalists for Cyprus
Olympic medalists in sailing
Medalists at the 2012 Summer Olympics
Sailors at the 2016 Summer Olympics – Laser
Competitors at the 2018 Mediterranean Games
Mediterranean Games silver medalists for Cyprus
Mediterranean Games medalists in sailing
Sailors at the 2008 Summer Olympics – Laser
Sailors at the 2012 Summer Olympics – Laser
Sailors at the 2020 Summer Olympics – Laser